JanLeonardo (born Jan Wöllert; 30 July 1970, Cuxhaven) is a German photographer, author and speaker of fine-art photography.

Biography 
JanLeonardo started off as a self-educated person in photography, preferably working at nighttime. Later on he became assistant of Reinhart-Wolf-Award laureate Stephan Meyer-Bergfeld. As an artist he has worked exclusively with bulb exposures in darkness or nighttime since 2005.  His personal challenge is patterned, controlled and choreographed artificial light, staged and organized in a performance. His photographs are easily mixed up with photos altered by image editing or digital images from scratch. He lives in the town of Bremen.

In 2013 JanLeonardo initiated the International Light Painting Award to internationally promote light art performance photography and light painting. The recipients are chosen bi-annually by an international jury consisting of representatives from industry and the arts.
In 2013 the award was endowed with non-cash prizes worth of €9,800.

From 2013 to 2016 JanLeonardo cooperated with the computer giant Lenovo. The world biggest computer company used the light painting photographs for social media advertising, tradeshows and mobil devices.

In 2014 JanLeonardo and Carlotta Bertelli were invited from the town Corigliano Calabro in Italy to photograph the town with lightpainting. The photographs were presented during the festival Corigliano Calabro Fotografia in the ducal Castello di Corigliano Calabro.

In 2016 the artist organized an international light painting exhibition and congress for photokina 2016.

In 2017 JanLeonardo and the gallery owner Curtis Briggs organized a light painting fundraising campaign for the internationally known boarding school Schule Schloss Salem and Kurt Hahn Foundation.

Awards and recognition
 German prize for science photography – 1. price (Deutscher Preis für Wissenschaftsfotografie)
 WissenSchafftBilder 2008 – 3. price
 LIGHT photo contest – 2. price, category nature

Selected exhibitions
 2008: Haus der Wissenschaft Bremen – Deutscher Preis für Wissenschaftsfotografie
 2012:  Art Room9 Galerie München – Night Views
 2013: Poimena Gallery Tasmania Australia – Luminous Nocturnal
 2013: Espace Piere Cardin – Exposition Internationale de Light-Painting Paris
 2014: Art Room9 Galerie München – Painting Lights & Jungle Nights
 2014: Waves of Shining Light – New Town Plaza – Hong Kong 2014
 2014: Exposition Lumières, L'Embarcadère

Selected published works 
 Faszination Lichtmalerei – JanLeonardo Wöllert & Jörg Miedza – dpunkt Verlag 2010 –
 Painting with Light – JanLeonardo Wöllert & Jörg Miedza – Rocky Nook USA 2011–
 Fotografieren statt knipsen – Rudolf Krahm – dpunkt Verlag 2011 – 
 Wilde Seite der Fotografie 2.0 – Cyrill Harnischmacher Hrsg. – dpunkt Verlag 2012 – 
 Nacht- und Restlichtfotografie – Meike Fischer – dpunkt Verlag 2013 – 
 Foto-Kalender 2011: Quest – Verlag National Geographic – 
 Digital Photo – Lichtkunst in Perfektion – February 2010
 Fine Art Printer – Lichtmalerei mit LED – January 2011
 Foto Digital – Lichtkünstler – January/February 2011
 ProfiFoto – Light Art Performance Photography – March 2011
 c't spezial Digitale Fotografie – Getanztes Licht – April 2011
 Pictures Magazin – Light Art Performance Photography – May 2014
 Popular Photography – JanLeonardo – Low Light Scenery – July 2013 (China)

Television features
 German Light Artist Illuminates Detian Falls – China Central Television (CCTV) – 10 April 2009
 Exposition Internationale de Light Painting LPWA France – 21 January 2014 
 Licht gestalten – Fotograf Jan Leonardo Wöllert – Euromaxx – 30 December 2011
 Der einzigartige Stil vom deutschen Fotografen JanLeonardo – THVL – 18 October 2013 
 El artista Jan Leonardo Wöllert en nuestra serie"Juegos de luces" – Euromaxx – 16 April 2012
 Lichtkünstler – JanLeonardo (LAPP-PRO) – Radio Bremen – 8 October 2009
 Lichtkunst unterm Hirschgarten (Munich) – München TV – 10 May 2014
 Spectacular long exposure photography – Euromaxx/ DW – 24 November 2018

Assignments and campaigns

 State capital Munich: Business Report 2013
 Tokio Motor Show: Poster Design
 Beitrag Stipendienfonds zugunsten der Kurt-Hahn-Stiftung Schule Schloss Salem

Citations
 Lichtfang / Gestalten mit Lichtgrafik – Jeanette Bohn – Diplomarbeit FH Wiesbaden 2009
 Tangible High Touch Visuals – Klanten, Ehrmann, Hübner – Die Gestalten Verlag GmbH 2009 – 
 Die wilde Seite der Fotografie  – Cyrill Harnischmacher Hrsg. – dpunkt Verlag 2009 
 Night Photography – Lance Keimig – Focal Press USA 2010 – 
 Licht – Gestaltung und Technologie – Bergische Universität Wuppertal, Fachbereich F – Design und Kunst, Sommersemester 2011 – Forschungs- und Lehrgebiet Professor Jürg Steiner – Dajana Richter
 Light Painting und die Veränderung durch die Digitale Fotografie mit besonderer Beachtung von LAPP – Dipl-Ing Lydia Mantler- Diplomarbeit FH St. Pölten 2014
 Light Painting / Entwicklung eines Pixel-Sticks Bachelorarbeit Universität Koblenz Landau 2016 vorgelegt von Marius Köpcke

References

External links
 
 Light Painting Photography profile
 Sony – Im Fokus: JanLeonardo Wöllert
 Trick of the light

 

1970 births
Living people
Photographers from Lower Saxony
People from Cuxhaven
German male writers